Joseph Foveaux (1767 – 20 March 1846) was a soldier and convict settlement administrator in colonial New South Wales, Australia.

Early life
Foveaux was baptised on 6 April 1767 at Ampthill, Bedfordshire, England, the sixth child of Joseph Foveaux and his wife Elizabeth, née Wheeler. Family tradition maintains he was actually born almost a year earlier, on 10 April 1766.

Foveaux was an ensign in the 60th regiment and then joined the New South Wales Corps in June 1789 as lieutenant and reached Sydney in 1791. There he was promoted to major and, as senior officer between August 1796 and November 1799, he controlled the Corps at a time when the senior officers were making fortunes from trading and extending their lands.  He soon became the largest landholder and stock-owner in the colony.

Norfolk island
In 1800, having established a reputation as an able and efficient administrator, Foveaux offered to go to Norfolk Island as Lieutenant-Governor. Finding the island run down, he built it up with particular attention to public works, for which he earned the praise of Governor King.

During this period, part of the first settlement of Norfolk Island (1788–1814), Norfolk Island was basically a free settlement with convicts making up no more than 10 per cent of the population.  While some individuals were sent from Sydney as a means of isolation, the Island was not a place of secondary punishment as it became in the second settlement (1825–1855).

Joseph Holt, a general during the 1798 Irish Rebellion, was imprisoned at Norfolk Island for a time in April 1804. Holt described him(Foveaux) as the greatest tyrant he had ever known in his memoirs. Holt wrote about the overjoyed inhabitants of the island upon his departure, and said, "If I could have bought or borrowed a pistol, the world, I think, would soon have been rid of this man-killer, Foveaux, and with as short a warning as he gave to the two men he hung without trial." 

Judgements of Foveaux's career are often clouded by a manuscript purporting to be the recollections of Norfolk Island gaoler Robert Jones.  This document is dated 1823, five years after Jones's death.  It contains paintings of buildings on Norfolk Island which were not erected until the 1840s.  Modern scholarship reveals it to be a forgery from after 1850 which contains no valid evidence on Foveaux's life and career.

Robert Hughes writing in The Fatal Shore relied on the false Jones document, as did Robert Macklin in Dark Paradise (2013).

In September 1804 Foveaux left Norfolk Island for England to attend to his private affairs and seek relief for the asthma that affected him.

Aftermath of the Rum Rebellion
Having recovered, he returned to New South Wales on the Sinclair to serve as Lieutenant-Governor, but on arrival in July 1808, he found Governor Bligh under arrest by officers of the New South Wales Corps in the event known as the Rum Rebellion. Foveaux assumed control, stating that he was not favouring either Bligh or the rebels. His control was characterised by a desire for cheap and efficient administration, improvement of public works, and encouragement of small-holders.

In January 1809, the acting Lieutenant-Governor, Colonel William Paterson, returned and Foveaux remained to assist him and his successor, Major-General Lachlan Macquarie.

Macquarie was impressed with Foveaux's administration and put him forward as Collins's successor as Lieutenant Governor of Van Diemen's Land, because he could think of no one more fitting, and considered that he could not have acted otherwise with regard to Bligh. However, when Foveaux returned to England in 1810, Macquarie's recommendation was put aside. Foveaux was promoted to Inspecting Field Officer in Ireland and in 1814 became a major-general.

Later life
He pursued an uneventful military career after that, rising to the rank of lieutenant-general in 1830. In 1814 he married Ann Sherwin, his partner since 1793, and they had a daughter born in 1801.

He died in London on 20 March 1846 and was buried in Kensal Green Cemetery.

Surry Hills 

Surry Hills near the centre of Sydney was once a farming area owned by Foveaux. His property was known as Surry Hills Farm, named after the Surrey Hills in Surrey, England. The main east-west street through the suburb is Foveaux Street, which gave its name to Kylie Tennant's 1939 novel Foveaux about inner city slum life.

Legacy
Foveaux Strait in New Zealand is named in his honour, as are streets in the Sydney suburbs of Airds, Barden Ridge, Bella Vista, Cromer, Harrington Park, Lurnea and Surry Hills, the Maitland suburb of Metford, and the Canberra suburb of Ainslie.

References

Further reading
 Whitaker, Anne-Maree, Joseph Foveaux: power and patronage in early New South Wales, Sydney, NSW University Press, 2000.
 
 Wright, Reg, 'The Most Flourishing Spot out of Old England', Tasmanian Historical Research Association Papers and Proceedings, vol. 46, no. 3 (1999), pp. 135–149.

1765 births
1846 deaths
Australian penal colony administrators
British Army lieutenant generals
Lieutenant-Governors of New South Wales
People from Norfolk Island
People from Ampthill
English emigrants to colonial Australia
Foveaux Strait
19th-century Australian public servants
Burials at Kensal Green Cemetery
Military personnel from Bedfordshire